Chestnut-fronted shrike-babbler has been split into two species:
 Trilling shrike-babbler, 	Pteruthius aenobarbus
 Clicking shrike-babbler, 	Pteruthius intermedius

Animal common name disambiguation pages